A Pythagorean quadruple is a tuple of integers , , , and , such that . They are solutions of a Diophantine equation and often only positive integer values are considered. However, to provide a more complete geometric interpretation, the integer values can be allowed to be negative and zero (thus allowing Pythagorean triples to be included) with the only condition being that . In this article we will assume, unless otherwise stated, that the values of a Pythagorean quadruple are all positive integers.

Parametrization of primitive quadruples 
A Pythagorean quadruple is called primitive if the greatest common divisor of its entries is 1. Every Pythagorean quadruple is an integer multiple of a primitive quadruple.

Thus, all primitive Pythagorean quadruples are characterized by the identity

Alternate parametrization

If  and  have different parity, let  be any factor of  such that . Note that .

This method generates all Pythagorean quadruples exactly once each when  and  run through all pairs of natural numbers and  runs through all permissible values for each pair.

Properties
The largest number that always divides the product  is 12. The quadruple with the minimal product is (1, 2, 2, 3).

Relationship with quaternions and rational orthogonal matrices

where the columns are pairwise orthogonal and each has norm . Furthermore, we have that  belongs to the orthogonal group , and, in fact, all 3 × 3 orthogonal matrices with rational coefficients arise in this manner.

Primitive Pythagorean quadruples with small norm
There are 31 primitive Pythagorean quadruples in which all entries are less than 30.

See also
Beal conjecture
Euler brick
Euler's sum of powers conjecture
Euler-Rodrigues formula for 3D rotations
Fermat cubic
Jacobi–Madden equation
Lagrange's four-square theorem (every natural number can be represented as the sum of four integer squares)
Legendre's three-square theorem (which natural numbers cannot be represented as the sum of three squares of integers)
Prouhet–Tarry–Escott problem
Quaternions and spatial rotation
Taxicab number

References

External links

Additive number theory
Arithmetic problems of plane geometry
Diophantine equations
Diophantine geometry
Quadruple
Squares in number theory